Jamie Maclaren (born 29 July 1993) is an Australian professional soccer player who plays as a striker for A-League club Melbourne City. He has also previously played for Darmstadt 98, Perth Glory, Brisbane Roar and Hibernian. Maclaren initially represented Scotland at youth level, but has since appeared for Australia at both youth and senior international level. He is a four time A-League Golden Boot winner as A-League top scorer in the 2016–17 (19 goals), 2019–20 (22 goals), 2020–21 (25 goals) and 2021–22 (15 goals) seasons.

Club career

Early years
Maclaren grew up in the north-western suburbs of Melbourne. He first joined the junior side of local team Sunbury United at the early age of four or five, then switched to the youth ranks of nearby Victorian Premier League (now National Premier Leagues Victoria) side Green Gully in 2003, where although he continued to play against older players, his team was very successful, at one point winning around 50 games in a row.

Blackburn Rovers
In July 2009, aged 15, he was invited to trial for Blackburn Rovers' under-16 squad. In his first trial match he scored two goals against Derby County's under-16 squad, followed by a hat-trick against Manchester United, which resulted in a contract offer from Rovers.

Maclaren benefited from the mentorship of fellow Australians Vince Grella and Brett Emerton at Blackburn, where he soon progressed to be a regular under-21 squad player and training with the senior team. However, after four years in England having not broken into the first team, he was released by Rovers at the end of the 2012–13 season.

Perth Glory
Seeking first-team game time, Maclaren elected to return to Australia and signed a three-year contract with A-League club Perth Glory at the beginning of the 2013–14 season. Maclaren made his Perth Glory debut, where he played 90 minutes, in a 3–1 loss against Adelaide United. Maclaren then scored his first goal for Perth Glory weeks later, on 27 October 2013, in a 1–0 win over Melbourne City and scored his second Perth Glory goal on 23 November 2013

The 2014–15 season was his breakout year, scoring 10 goals in 23 appearances across all competitions, and earning the April nomination for the league's young player of the year award. He also made a number of appearances in the National Premier Leagues side scoring 11 goals in just five games. Maclaren scored his first senior club hat-trick, scoring all three of Glory's goals in a 3–1 win against Melbourne City on 19 April 2015.

At the end of the 2014–15 season, in the fallout from the Perth Glory salary cap scandal, Glory agreed to release all contracted players who wished to leave the club, with the sole exception of Maclaren. In response, he lodged a formal breach-of-contract notice against Perth Glory to the players' Union, Professional Footballers Australia. Maclaren was subsequently released by Glory on 29 June 2015.

Brisbane Roar

During the A-League off-season, on 5 July 2015, Brisbane Roar signed Maclaren to a two-year deal.

Maclaren made his debut with the Roar against the Western Sydney Wanderers on 8 October 2015. In the same game, he scored a brace for the Roar, with goals in the 9th and 34th minutes of the match. Later that season Maclaren reached his 50th senior A-League appearance, scoring a goal and assisting another against his former club, Perth Glory. He scored his second senior club hat-trick in a win against Melbourne Victory on 12 March 2016.

Maclaren finished the A-League regular season with 18 goals, second in the Golden Boot race to Melbourne City's Uruguayan striker Bruno Fornaroli, however his season tally was enough to become the all-time A-League record for an Australian player. Maclaren scored two more goals in the finals series to make his final club goal count 20 from 25 games. At the end of the 2015–16 season, he was awarded as the Young Player of the Year by the FFA.

Maclaren scored 19 goals for the Roar in the 2016-17 A-League regular season, tying with Besart Berisha for the Golden Boot.

Darmstadt 98
In May 2017, Maclaren joined German 2. Bundesliga club Darmstadt 98 signing a three-year deal. He made his debut in the second round of the season as a 63rd minute substitution in a 1–1 draw away to FC Kaiserslautern on 4 August.

Loans to Hibernian
Maclaren was loaned to Scottish club Hibernian in January 2018, in the hope that more playing time would boost his chances of being selected by Australia for the 2018 FIFA World Cup. He made his Scottish Premiership debut in a 1–0 win at Dundee on 24 January. Maclaren scored his first goal for Hibs on 3 February, converting a match-winning penalty against Rangers. He scored the second goal in a 2–0 win for Hibs in an Edinburgh derby on 9 March, and helped to delay Celtic's title celebrations by scoring the first goal in a 2–1 win for Hibs on 21 April. He ended his season in Scotland by scoring a hat-trick in a 5–5 draw with Rangers.

After the loan spell ended, Maclaren said that he hoped Darmstadt would make him available for transfer. On 3 August, Maclaren returned to Hibernian on a season-long loan. This spell was less productive, as Maclaren only scored one goal and he struggled to hold down a regular place in the starting lineup. The Hibs terminated the loan on 31 January 2019.

Melbourne City
On 31 January 2019, Maclaren signed for A-League club Melbourne City FC on a marquee deal to see him at the club till May 2022. He scored in his first game for City with a backheel against Adelaide United on 9 February. He won the Golden Boot that season with 22 goals, three more than the nearest competitor, Adam Le Fondre.

On 6 March 2021, Maclaren scored  and assisted two in Melbourne City's 6–0 away win over city rivals Melbourne Victory. On the next meeting on 17 April 2021, he became the first player to score five goals in the A-League regular season history, and just the second of all time, as the hosts won 7–0. He became Melbourne City's record goalscorer with 58 goals on 13 May 2021, when his team won 4–1 against Adelaide United at home overtaking Bruno Fornaroli.

International career

His international career started when he was called up for Scotland under-19, who he was eligible to play for through his father Donald. Maclaren made two appearances for the team, playing against Denmark and Norway. Maclaren was then involved with the Australian under-20 squad, and scored a goal against the hosts Turkey in the 2013 FIFA U-20 World Cup.

Maclaren joined the Australian under-23 team ("Olyroos") for 2016 AFC U-23 Championship qualification Group F games held in Taiwan in March 2015, which doubled as Olympic qualification. He played in two of the Olyroos' three games, scoring a hat-trick against Hong Kong and another two goals against Myanmar, achieving the second highest tally for the qualification stage out of the entire AFC. Maclaren was named in the Australian squad for the 2016 AFC U-23 Championship, where he played every minute of Australia's campaign in three games against the UAE, Vietnam and Jordan, scoring against Vietnam.

In February 2016, Maclaren announced that he pledged to play for Australia rather than Scotland, but later expressed his pride at having been selected for the young Scots. In May 2016, Maclaren was called up to the Socceroos for the first time for a friendly match away to England, in which he started. After a solid start to the 2016–17 A-League season, Maclaren was called up again to the Socceroos squad in November 2016 for Australia's 2018 World Cup Qualifying Third Round match against Thailand in Bangkok. He started the match, playing 57 minutes in the eventual 2–2 draw before being substituted for Nathan Burns. He was again called up for the final two Round 3 matches in August and September 2017, coming on in the 71st minute of the crucial final match at home to Thailand, which the Socceroos won 2–1.

Maclaren dropped out of the Australia squad later in 2017, due to his lack of playing time at Darmstadt. A major factor in him seeking a loan move in January 2018 was to try and earn selection for the 2018 World Cup squad. He was named in a 32-man provisional squad for the World Cup, but was cut from the 26-man squad to go to a pre-tournament camp in Turkey. Following an injury to Tomi Juric, Maclaren was added to the training squad. He played in a preparatory friendly match against Czech Republic, and was selected in the final 23-man squad.

Incoming Socceroo coach Graham Arnold selected Maclaren in the Australian squad for the 2019 AFC Asian Cup. He came on as a 64th minute substitute in the only pre-tournament friendly against Oman, and started all three matches in the group stage;  a loss against Jordan, having a potential equaliser ruled offside, the second match against Palestine, scoring his first international goal in the 18th minute with a header from a Tom Rogic cross, and the last game, a win against Syria. Maclaren continued in the starting XI for the Socceroos in the first knockout stage match, against Uzbekistan, playing the first 75 minutes before being replaced by Apostolos Giannou in the eventual win on penalties. He was named to start alongside Giannou in a changed two-striker formation in the Quarter Final against hosts UAE.

Maclaren scored a hat-trick in a 5–0 win against Nepal on 10 October 2019.

Personal life
Maclaren holds a British passport, and is half-Maltese through his mother. This partial Maltese heritage led to Malta approaching Maclaren to play for them, however, he turned down the request. His father Donald had a short career as a footballer with Dunfermline Athletic (after failing to break through at Heart of Midlothian) prior to emigrating to Australia, while his paternal uncle Ross MacLaren played in the English leagues with Shrewsbury Town, Derby County and Swindon Town.

Maclaren is an Aston Villa fan and Collingwood in the AFL

Career statistics

Club

International

Honours
Melbourne City
 A-League Men Premiership: 2020–21, 2021–22

Individual
A-League Young Footballer of the Year: 2015–16, 2016–17.
PFA A-League Team of the Season: 2015–16, 2019–20, 2020–21, 2021–22
A-League Golden Boot: 2016–17, 2019–20, 2020–21., 2021–22
Harry Kewell Medal: 2016.
A-Leagues All Star: 2022

See also
List of sportspeople who competed for more than one nation

References

External links

1993 births
Living people
Australian soccer players
Australia international soccer players
Australian expatriate soccer players
Australian expatriate sportspeople in Germany
Australian expatriate sportspeople in Scotland
Expatriate footballers in Germany
Expatriate footballers in Scotland
Scottish footballers
Scotland youth international footballers
Australian people of Scottish descent
Australian expatriate sportspeople in England
Expatriate footballers in England
Soccer players from Melbourne
Association football forwards
Perth Glory FC players
Brisbane Roar FC players
SV Darmstadt 98 players
Hibernian F.C. players
Melbourne City FC players
A-League Men players
National Premier Leagues players
2017 FIFA Confederations Cup players
2. Bundesliga players
Australian people of Maltese descent
Scottish Professional Football League players
2018 FIFA World Cup players
2019 AFC Asian Cup players
Marquee players (A-League Men)
People from Sunbury, Victoria
2022 FIFA World Cup players